The Findlay Group is a group of islands in the Arctic Archipelago in Qikiqtaaluk Region, Nunavut. This Arctic Ocean group consists of Lougheed Island, Stupart Island, Edmund Walker Island, Grosvenor Island and Patterson Island.

Mapping

A.Lougheed Island, 
B.Stupart Island, 
C.Edmund Walker Island, 
D.Grosvenor Island, 
E.Patterson Island,

External links
 Findlay Group in the Atlas of Canada - Toporama; Natural Resources Canada

Islands of the Queen Elizabeth Islands
Uninhabited islands of Qikiqtaaluk Region
Archipelagoes of the Canadian Arctic Archipelago